William Johan Frantzen (born 13 June 1993) is a retired Norwegian footballer who played his entire senior career as a midfielder for Tromsø.

Frantzen was born in Hammerfest, but grew up in Honningsvåg.

Career statistics

References

1993 births
Living people
People from Nordkapp
People from Hammerfest
Norwegian footballers
Association football midfielders
Tromsø IL players
Eliteserien players
Norwegian First Division players
Sportspeople from Troms og Finnmark